The Stover Manufacturing and Engine Company was created by D.C. Stover in 1881. An established inventor, he progressed through a profitable windmill business to, in 1895, the manufacture of kerosene and gasoline powered stationary engines for use on the American farm.

History 
The Stover company began producing windmills in 1879.</ref> It was incorporated in 1881 as the Stover Manufacturing and Engine Company and by 1922 they had 600 employees.

Stover made more than 277,000 engines of various sizes and uses. Stover licensed some designs to Sears, Roebuck and Co. under the Economy trademark.

References

Engine manufacturers of the United States